Elita Proctor Otis (1851 or 1860 – August 10, 1927) was an American actress. She had a long distinguished stage career before her foray into early silent films. In 1909 she may have been the first actress to play Nancy Sikes on screen in a Vitagraph produced version of Oliver Twist.

Early years and career
She was born around 1860 in Cleveland, Ohio. Her father, William Henry Otis, was a banker. Redfield Proctor, who was a senator from Vermont, was her great-uncle.

Otis's stage debut came with the Kemble Dramatic Society. She made her professional debut as Ernestine Echo in Crust of Society at the Globe Theatre in Boston.

Broadway plays in which Otis performed included The House of Bondage (1914), Potash and Perlmutter (1913), Are You a Crook? (1913), The Purple Road (1913), The Greyhound (1912), The Three Romeos (1911), The Girl from Rector's (1909), Mary's Lamb (1908), Society and the Bulldog (1908), The Little Michus (1907), About Town (1906), The Two Orphans (1904), In the Midst of Life (1902), The Brixton Burglary (1901), Quo Vadis (1900), Woman and Wine (1900), and A Ward of France (1897).

Later years and death 
Otis was married to William C. Camp.

For the last 12 years of her life she was an invalid. She died on August 10, 1927, in Pelham, New York. Her funeral was held at the Church of the Transfiguration on August 17, 1927, and she was buried in Woodlawn Cemetery.

Filmography
 Adventures of a Drummer Boy (1909) (credited as Elita Otis)
 Oliver Twist (1909) as Nancy Sykes
 Les Misérables (Part I) (1909) aka The Galley Slave
 A Midsummer Night's Dream (1909) as Hippolyta
 The Great Diamond Robbery (1914) as Mother Rosenbaum
 The Greyhound (1914) as 'Deep Sea Kitty' Doyle
 The Triflers (1920) (as Olita Otis) as. Effie Stilwell
 Under Northern Lights (1920) (credited as Oleta Ottis) as Madge Carson
 The Torrent (1921) (credited as Oleta Ottis) as Anne Mayhew
 While the Devil Laughs (1921) (credited as Oleta Ottis) as Pearl De La Marr
 The Secret of the Hills (1921) (credited as Oleta Otis) as Mrs. Miltimore
 The Infidel (1922) (credited as Oleta Otis) as Miss Parliss
 Refuge (1923) (credited as Olita Otis) as The Princess
 Miss Nobody (1926) (credited as Oleta Otis) as Miriam Arnold
 The Lost Express (1926) as Mrs. Arthur Standish

References

External links

1851 births
1927 deaths
19th-century American actresses
20th-century American actresses
Actresses from Cleveland
American stage actresses